Francisco Marroquín University (Spanish: Universidad Francisco Marroquín), also known by the abbreviation UFM, is a private, secular university in Guatemala City, Guatemala. It describes its mission as "to teach and disseminate the ethical, legal, and overall economic principles of a society of free and responsible persons."

According to Milton Friedman, it is "one of the leading universities in Latin America."

History
It was founded in 1971 by Manuel F. Ayau, known as Muso. Its namesake is Francisco Marroquín, an early bishop of Guatemala and translator of Central American languages, but the university does not follow any of his teachings or philosophies. Started by members of Center for Economic and Social Studies with $40,000 and 125 students, UFM counted 2700 undergraduate students and 1500 graduate students as of 2009. The philosophy statement says that "universities need to place themselves beyond the conflicts of their time so that science and academic freedom – which humankind will need at all times – may be preserved."

Degrees
In Guatemala, as in most of the rest of Latin America, the educational system concentrates students in their academic or professional discipline from the time of admission. Following secondary school, students are admitted to a particular school or department and, beginning the first year, they follow a prescribed program leading to a degree.

Undergraduate
Licenciatura degree (Licentiate): in most of Latin America, the degree most commonly awarded to undergraduate students is the licenciatura. Traditionally, it includes several more academic credits than does a B.A. or a B.S.
 Disciplines: architecture, business administration, clinical nutrition, economics, education, international relations, law, political studies, public accounting and auditing, psychology (clinical and industrial).
 M.D./D.D.S.: Students are admitted directly into medical and dental schools as high-school graduates. Then follows a three-year program of basic science studies after which students receive a B.S. degree. It is followed by four years of medical or three of dental studies and one year of internship for medical students. The, graduates receive an M.D.(doctor of medicine) or D.D.S. (doctor of dental surgery) degree. Dental graduates may pursue residency specialization into Oral & Maxillofacial Surgery (four years), Peridodontics (2–3 years), Endodontics (2–3 years), Orthodontics (2–3 years), etc.
 Associate degree: disciplines include art history and personnel administration.
 Profesorado degree: the profesorado is a specialized degree for secondary school teachers. In many cases, it is required for employment: disciplines include art history, computer studies, social sciences and language.

Graduate
Master's degree disciplines: business administration (MBA); virtual business administration (online MBA); real estate project management (MAPI); entrepreneurial economics; international political economy; international relations, finance and taxation (MFIN); management of human resources; social sciences.
Master's degree in the following medical specialties: internal medicine, ophthalmology, pediatrics, radiology.

Doctoral degree
Doctoral degree disciplines: economics, law, social sciences.

Areas of instruction
 Accounting
 Architecture
 Business administration
 Clinical nutrition
 Dentistry
 Economics
 Education
 International relations
 Journalism
 Law
 Medicine, including internal medicine; ophthalmology; pediatrics; and radiology
 Political studies
 Psychology
 Social sciences

Departments and projects
The Ludwig von Mises Library has 100,000 visitors annually and is the most extensive collection of works on liberty in Latin America. There is a collection of the private libraries of prominent intellectuals and collectors:
 José Cecilio del Valle, a founding father of Central American independence.
 Carlos Elmenhorst, collector of Central American books and maps.
 William Hutt, an English author and economist.
 Gordon Tullock, co-founder of the school of Public Choice
 Sir Alan Walters, an economic advisor to Margaret Thatcher.

At the beginning of the 2000s, the library started offering access to digital resources. It is subscribed to other services in this area including EBSCOHost databases, Oxford Scholarship Online, xRefer Plus and UpToDate, MDConsult and others.

The library was chosen among all the libraries around the World within the 10 libraries to receive the Elsevier donation of 670 titles.
The library site received the Arroba de Oro award in Guatemala for the best educational website.

The Henry Hazlitt Center co-ordinates the courses of Economic Process (I, II and III) and Social Philosophy (Hayek and the Austrian School) that are offered to all undergraduate students in all schools. It also offers seminars and lectures for professors in order to improve their academic and pedagogic skills.

The Center for the Study of Capitalism  was founded in 2009 with the support of the university as a private, secular, coeducational, nonresidential, nonprofit center of study. It organizes socratic dialogue sessions with high school students and young entrepreneurs to study philosophical values as guides to excellence in thinking and action. Since its foundation, more than 1000 participants have joined philosophical discussions.

The Arboretum awakens and cultivates the love for nature and conservation of plants and animals in the campus. The land of the university is a remnant of the Montano Forest of pine and Encino trees that used to cover Guatemala. The beautiful gardens  have been carefully designed to integrate native and exotic species, which have been admired by students and visitors. Since the beginning, preservation of the forest was a priority, to the point that the library's architectural design of the buildings was done to keep the trees as intact as possible.

New Media Department – Creation, Implementation & Effective Management of Digital Resources – The New Media Department specializes in streaming audio and video conferences in English and Spanish on topics related to classical liberal thought.
Sampler:
 Milton and Rose Friedman's Free to Choose series (in Spanish)
 James Buchanan conference for the opening of Latin America's first Public Choice Center (2001) 
 Vernon L. Smith honorary doctorate ceremony (2004)
 Interview of Milton and Rose Friedman for the 2002 Mont Pelerin Society General Meeting in London 
The New Media digital library includes 1,500 hours of digitized and indexed educational material, and receives over 1000 visitors daily from around the world.

The Museo Popol Vuh Museum offers its visitors a unique journey through Guatemalan history, illustrated by one of the best collections of prehispanic and colonial art in the country. The museum is a scientific, private, nonprofit organization for the conservation, investigation and the popularization of Guatemala's cultural and archeological heritage.

Lienzo de Quauhquechollan  is a large Nahua painting on cotton cloth (lienzo) that belongs to the pre-Hispanic tradition of documenting stories of migrations and conquests within a geographic context. Considered the first map of Guatemala, it is one of the few sources from the 16th century that tell of the military campaigns of Jorge de Alvarado in 1527. A digitally-restored copy and an animated recreation of the story, exhibited at the campus, are based on the research done by Dutch archaeologist Florine Asselbergs.

The ITA Scholarship Program (an acronym for Impulso al Talento Academico) stands for "promotion of academic talent." The program grants scholarships for undergraduate degrees to the poorest, most highly qualified and most motivated students. The scholarship covers full tuition and fees, room and board, medical insurance, and a stipend for public transportation, books, and basic personal expenses.

Traditions and landmarks
Following Manuel Ayau, in 1972, the first class of students that entered to the university presented a pair of bronzed shoes to the founding rector, Ayau, as a joke. Since then the shoes are kept at the rector's office; as a way to remember to follow Ayau's steps and those of the founders of the university on the road to freedom.

Honoring the champions of freedom, it has awarded honoris causa doctorates to scientists, intellectuals, businessmen, artists and others who have contributed to the sciences, the arts, the world of business and the cause of freedom. Four Nobel Prize winners have accepted an honorary degree awarded by the university: Friedrich Hayek; Milton Friedman, James M. Buchanan, and Vernon L. Smith.

At the House of Freedom, the library is named after Ludwig von Mises; there are the Friedrich A. Hayek Auditorium and the Milton Friedman Auditorium. The department in charge of the courses of Social Philosophy and Economic Process is named after Henry Hazlitt. There is a Freedom Plaza and a terrace named after Rose Friedman.

Mises's birthday, September 29, is celebrated by Professor Joseph Keckeissen's students with a Viennese party by the second semester of every year. It includes theatrical presentations, singing and dancing. Keckeissen attended Mises's Seminar in New York City and he began the theatrical tradition in the 1980s with the Guttenberg Society.

Commencement ceremony – On May and November, UFM celebrates commencement ceremonies. During these the graduating students receive their titles and diplomas. On that occasion the Board of Directors award the honoris causa doctorates.

Honor graduates ceremony – The night before the commencement ceremony, at UFM, they celebrate a ceremony and a cocktail party in praise of those students which graduate with honors, and to celebrate excellence (in Spanish). The honors awarded are cum laude, for those who obtained grades between 85 and 90: magna cum laude, for those who obtained grades between 91 and 94; and summa cum laude, for those who accumulated an average between 95 and 100.

Inaugural Lesson – The Inaugural Lesson enjoys a long academic tradition. At Universidad Francisco Marroquín it is a Commencement ceremony and an opportunity to get together the faculty and the students around the philosophy of freedom presented by a local or visiting professor. The first Inaugural Lesson, at UFM, was presented by vicerector emeritus Rigoberto Juárez-Paz, and it was about Plato's Academy.

Landmarks on campus
Marroquín's bust, as the university is named after Bishop Marroquín, because he was the first prelate ordained in America in the colonial times. During his tenure as bishop, Marroquín took care of the rights of indigenous people and helped fund the first university in Central America. Marroquín's bust was donated to the university by Trustee Félix Montes in January 1975. The sculptor is José Nicolás. However, the university is nondenominational.

Hayek's bust, as he was awarded the Nobel Memorial Prize in Economic Sciences in 1974. He visited 1977, when he was awarded an honoris causa doctorate in social sciences. The House of Freedom, the auditorium of the Academic Building, is named for Hayek. His bust is located at the Ludwig von Mises Library and was donated by Walter S. Morris, of Little Rock, Arkansas, in 1991.

Mises's bust, as he was a luminary of the Austrian School. He visited Guatemala when he was invited by the Centro de Estudios Económico-Sociales and supported for the foundation of the university. His bust was donated by the class of 1975 by the School of Business.

The Atlas Libertas is a bas relief placed on the main façade of the UFM Business School. A high-relief sculpture of a human figure supporting the universe seen from the back from head to hip. The universe is represented by a series of semicircles (abstract planets and gear mechanisms). The sculpture is made of brass plate with a cyan-colored finish, resembling oxidized copper.

The Central Garden (renamed the Garden of Manuel Ayau) ismodeled after a Greek amphitheater and hosts the commencement ceremonies. The bust of Marroquin is the focus of the garden. In 2011, after the death of founder Ayau, it was renamed to honor him.

The Academic Building's Garden is surrounded by classrooms and the administration offices, seven stories high. Nevertheless, with an air of a Japanese garden and pond, it is an oasis of tranquility, removed from the exuberance of the campus itself.

There is a fountain at the Ludwig von Mises Library, near the Central Garden.

Journals
 Apuntes de Economía y Política (Public Choice Newsletter)
 Areté (Journal of the Department of Education)
 Arquitemas (Journal of the School of Architecture)
 Eleutheria (Philosophy Department)
 Laissez-Faire (Economics Journal)
 Revista de la Facultad de Derecho (Law Review)

Recipients of honorary degrees
 John A. Allison IV (Former CEO of BB&T)
 José María Aznar (former prime minister of Spain)
 Leszek Balcerowicz (Finance Minister of Poland)
 James M. Buchanan (Nobel Prize in Economics laureate)
 Alejandro Chafuen (President of the Atlas Economic Research Foundation)
 Edward H. Crane (Founder and President of the Cato Institute)
 T. Kenneth Cribb, Jr. Former President of the Intercollegiate Studies Institute and Advisor to President Reagan
 Michael Deaver (Reagan Advisor)
 Michael DeBakey (Heart surgeon)
 Edwin J. Feulner Jr. (President, The Heritage Foundation)
 Steve Forbes (Publisher)
 Viktor Frankl (Psychologist)
 Milton Friedman (Nobel Prize in Economics laureate)
 Friedrich Hayek (Nobel Prize in Economics laureate)
 Jeane Kirkpatrick (Ambassador)
 Václav Klaus (former prime minister of the Czech Republic))
 William Middendorf II (Ambassador)
 Carlos Alberto Montaner (Novelist)
 Barbara Oakley (Educator, Engineer, Writer)
 José Piñera (Architect of Chile's private pension system)
 Ruth Richardson (Former Minister of Finance, New Zealand)
 Jim Rogers (Investor)
 Robert Sirico (Clergyman, founder of the Acton Institute)
 Vernon L. Smith (Nobel Prize in Economics laureate)
 John Stossel (Award-winning television news host, writer, and author.)
 Nick Szabo (Blockchain expert, computer scientist, cryptographer, applied-science innovator, historian, socio-economics philosopher, legal scholar)
 Peter Thiel (Entrepreneur founder of PayPal)
 Mario Vargas Llosa (Nobel Prize in Literature laureate, Novelist, Journalist)

See also
 List of universities in Guatemala

References

External links

 Universidad Francisco Marroquín – Francisco Marroquin University
 UFM – Biblioteca Ludwig von Mises
 Center for the Study of Capitalism – Francisco Marroquin University
 UFM – New Media Department
 Atlas Libertas – UFM Celebrates 50th Anniversary of Ayn Rand's "Atlas Shrugged"
 article about the Francisco Marroquin University in French
 Viennese Party at The Francisco Marroquin University, New Media
 UFM Arboretum
 Libertate Viam Facere.  Objectivism and Ayn Rand
 CADEP (Center for the Analysis of Public Choice Decisions)
 Henry Hazlitt Center
 Official Facebook Page

 
Educational organizations based in Guatemala
Educational institutions established in 1971
1971 establishments in Guatemala